Aimée de Jongh (born 1988) is a Dutch cartoonist, animator, and illustrator who publishes in Dutch and English. Her books have received the Prix Saint-Michel, the Atomium Comic Strip Prizes and the International Manga Award.

Biography 
De Jongh was born in  Waalwijk, southern Netherlands. She studied animation at Rotterdam's Willem de Kooning Academy.

She began publishing small-press comics in 2004, and two years later published her first book, Aimée TV, an adaptation of her webcomic. She is the author of the books TAXI! verhalen vanaf de achterbank/TAXI! stories from the back seat and De Terugkeer van de Wespendief/The Return of the Honey Buzzard. With Belgian cartoonist Zidrou she coauthored Obsolescence programmée de nos sentiments/Blossoms in Autumn.

De Jongh has produced comic strips including Reborn and Snippers. She has also created animated films including Aurora. 

In 2017 she travelled to refugee camps in Lesbos, Greece with cartoonists Judith Vanistendael and Mei-Li Nieuwland. This resulted in de Jongh's work of graphic journalism, "De wachtkamer van Europa"/"Europe's waiting room".

She lives in Rotterdam, where in 2018 she created artwork for the cube house hostel StayOkay.

References 

1988 births
Living people
Dutch cartoonists
Willem de Kooning Academy alumni
International Manga Award winners
Dutch women cartoonists
People from Waalwijk
Dutch webcomic creators
Dutch animated film directors
Artists from Rotterdam